Robert Cabot Sherman Jr. (born July 22, 1943), known professionally as Bobby Sherman, is an American retired paramedic, police officer, singer, actor and occasional songwriter who became a teen idol in the late 1960s and early 1970s. He had a series of successful singles, notably the million-seller "Little Woman" (1969). Sherman retreated from his show business career in the 1970s for a career as an EMT and a deputy sheriff, though he occasionally performed into the 1990s.

Entertainment career

Music
In 1962, Sal Mineo wrote two songs for Sherman as well as arranging for Sherman to record the songs. In 1964, when Mineo asked Sherman to sing with his old band at a Hollywood party (where many actors and agents were in attendance), Sherman was signed with an agent and eventually landed a part on the ABC television show Shindig! as a regular cast member/house singer.

Sherman made several records with Decca and another smaller label and was featured in teen magazines. In early 1968, he was selected for the role of a bashful, stammering logger, Jeremy Bolt, in the ABC television series Here Come the Brides (1968-1970). As of 1970, Bobby Sherman had received more fan mail than any other performer on the ABC-TV network.

Sherman appeared on an episode of Honey West titled "The Princess and the Paupers" as a kidnapped band member and an episode of The Monkees titled "Monkees at the Movies", playing a pompous surfer/singer named Frankie Catalina in the vein of Frankie Avalon, performing the song "The New Girl in School" (the flip of Jan & Dean's "Dead Man's Curve").

Sherman released 107 songs, 23 singles and 10 albums between 1962 and 1976. In his recording career, he earned seven gold singles, one platinum single, and five gold albums. He had a career total of seven top 40 hits. In 1969, he signed with Metromedia Records. In May 1969, he released the single "Little Woman", which peaked at #3 on the Billboard Hot 100 chart (#2 in Canada) and spent nine weeks in the Top 20. It sold over one million copies and was awarded a gold disc by the R.I.A.A. in October 1969.

His other hits were "Julie, Do Ya Love Me" (US #5/AC #2) (Canada #3) (Australia #3) (written by Tom Bahler), "Easy Come, Easy Go" (US #9/AC #2) (Canada #6), "Jennifer" (US #60/AC #9) (Canada #32), "La La La (If I Had You)" (US #9/AC #14) (Canada #7), and "The Drum" (US #29/AC #2) (Canada #7) (written by Alan O'Day). Some of these songs were produced by Jackie Mills, a Hollywood record producer, who also produced the Brady Bunch Kids. In Canada, "Hey, Mister Sun" reached #19, "Cried Like a Baby" reached #10, and "Waiting At The Bus Stop" reached #31. "La, La, La," "Easy Come, Easy Go," and "Julie, Do Ya Love Me" all sold in excess of a million copies and garnered further gold discs for Sherman. "Julie, Do Ya Love Me" was Sherman's sole excursion in the UK Singles Chart, where it peaked at #28 in November 1970. The song competed there for chart space with White Plains' cover version, which eventually placed higher at #8.

Sherman toured extensively through the United States and the world in support of his records and albums.  He gave many concerts to sellout crowds of mostly screaming young women from the late 1960s to the mid-1970s.  The screaming of the young women was so loud that Sherman experienced hearing loss.

Television
Sherman was a regular star on the weekly ABC television network show Here Come the Brides on from September 25, 1968, to April 3, 1970.  The series was loosely based upon the Mercer Girls project, Asa Mercer's efforts to bring civilization to old Seattle in the 1860s by importing marriageable women from the east coast cities of the United States, where the ravages of the American Civil War left those towns short of men.  Bobby Sherman played the youngest brother, Jeremy Bolt.

Sherman was a frequent guest on American Bandstand and Where the Action Is. A March 1971 episode of The Partridge Family featured Sherman, serving as a back-door pilot for the ABC TV series Getting Together, which aired starting in September 1971. The show was canceled after 14 episodes.Brady Bunch too.

Sherman was a guest star on television series such as Emergency!, The F.B.I., The Mod Squad, Ellery Queen, Murder She Wrote and Frasier. He has also been a guest on The Ed Sullivan Show, American Bandstand, The Sonny & Cher Comedy Hour, KTLA Morning News, Visiting with Huell Howser on PBS, Good Day LA, The Rosie O'Donnell Show, Good Morning America, and The Tonight Show with both Johnny Carson and later Jay Leno.  He was featured on 20/20, VH1, Entertainment Tonight, and Extra, among other television shows.

Sherman was a regular cast member on the television show Sanchez of Bel Air in 1986.

Comeback and retirement
In 1998, after a 25-year absence, fans returned to see Sherman in concert as part of "The Teen Idol Tour" with Peter Noone and Davy Jones. Monkees member Micky Dolenz replaced Davy Jones on the tour in 1999. Sherman performed his last concert to date as a solo performer in Lincoln, Rhode Island on August 25, 2001. Although retired from public life, he still appeared at corporate and charity events. He was ranked #8 in TV Guides list of "TV's 25 Greatest Teen Idols" (January 23, 2005 issue).

Post-entertainment career

When Sherman guest-starred on an episode of the Jack Webb television series Emergency! ("Fools", season 3, episode 17, aired January 19, 1974), he found a new calling. Eventually, he left the public spotlight and became an emergency medical technician (EMT). He volunteered with the Los Angeles Police Department, working with paramedics and giving CPR and first aid classes. He officially became a technical Reserve Police Officer with the Los Angeles Police Department in the 1990s, a position he still held as of 2017. For more than a decade he served as a medical training officer at the Los Angeles Police Academy, instructing thousands of police officers in first aid and CPR. He was named LAPD's Reserve Officer of the Year in 1999.

Sherman also became a reserve deputy sheriff in 1999 with the San Bernardino County Sheriff's Department, continuing his CPR/emergency training of new deputy hires. Sherman retired from the sheriff's department in 2010.

Sherman and his wife co-founded the Brigitte & Bobby Sherman Children's (BBSC) Foundation. The foundation's mission is to provide motivated students in Ghana with a high quality education and music program, providing tools to pursue higher education.

Personal life
Sherman was born to Robert Cabot Sherman Sr. and Juanita (née Freeman) Sherman in Santa Monica, California. He grew up in Van Nuys, California, with his sister Darlene.

Published accounts indicate that Sherman's relationship with Sal Mineo was personal as well as professional.

Sherman married Brigitte Poublon on July 18, 2010, in Las Vegas. Sherman has two sons, Christopher and Tyler, with his first wife, Patti Carnel.

Discography

Singles 

 1962 "Judy, You'll Never Know (I'll Never Tell You)"/"The Telegram" (Starcrest)
 1963 "I Want to Hear It From Her"/"Nobody's Sweetheart" (Dot)
 1964 "You Make Me Happy"/"Man Overboard" (Decca)
 1965 "It Hurts Me"/"Give Me Your Word" (Decca)
 1965 "Hey Little Girl"/"Well, Allright" (Decca)
 1965 "Anything Your Little Heart Desires"/Goody Galum-Shus" (Parkway)
 1965 "Happiness Is"/"Can't Get Used To Losing You" (Cameo)
 1967 "Cold Girl"/"Think Of Rain" (Epic)
 1969 "Judy, You'll Never Know (I'll Never Tell You")/"The Telegram" (Condor) (reissue)
 1969 "Little Woman"/"One Too Many Mornings" (Metromedia), Pop #3
 1969 "La La La (If I Had You)"/"Time" (Metromedia), Pop #9, Adult Contemporary #14
 1970 "Easy Come, Easy Go"/"Sounds Along the Way" (Metromedia), Pop #9, Adult Contemporary #2
 1970 "Hey, Mister Sun"/"Two Blind Minds" (Metromedia), Pop #24, Adult Contemporary #3
 1970 "Julie, Do Ya Love Me"/"Spend Some Time Lovin Me" (Metromedia), Pop #5, Adult Contemporary #2
 1971 "Goin' Home (Sing a Song of Christmas Cheer)"/"Love's What You're Getting For Christmas" (Metromedia)
 1971 "Cried Like a Baby"/"Is Anybody There" (Metromedia), Pop #16, Adult Contemporary #9
 1971 "The Drum"/"Free Now To Roam" (Metromedia), Pop #29, Adult Contemporary #2
 1971 "Waiting At The Bus Stop"/"Run Away" (Metromedia), Pop #54
 1971 "Jennifer"/"Getting Together" (Metromedia), Pop #60, Adult Contemporary #9
 1972 "Together Again"/"Picture A Little Girl" (Metromedia), Pop #91
 1972 "I Don't Believe In Magic"/"Just A Little While Longer" (Metromedia)
 1972 "Early In the Morning"/"Unborn Lullabye" (Metromedia), Pop #113
 1974 "Mr. Success"/"Runaway" (Janus)
 1975 "Our Last Song Together"/"Sunshine Rose" (Janus), Adult Contemporary #34

Original LPs 

 1969 Bobby Sherman (Metromedia), Pop #11, Gold album
 1970 Here Comes Bobby (Metromedia), Pop #10, Gold album
 1970 With Love, Bobby (Metromedia), Pop #20, Gold album
 1970 Christmas Album (Metromedia) (see NOTE below)
 1971 Portrait of Bobby (Metromedia), Pop #48
 1971 Getting Together (Metromedia), Pop #71
 1972 Just For You (Metromedia)

NOTE: Metromedia released 2 versions of Christmas Album: one contained "Prologue"; the other replaced it with "Goin' Home (Sing A Song Of Christmas Cheer)"—rest of LP is identical.

Compilation LPs 

 1971 Bobby Bobby Bobby (promo only) (Metromedia Special Products)
 1972 Bobby Sherman's Greatest Hits (Metromedia), Pop #83
 1972 Everything You Always Wanted To Know About Bobby Sherman (Superstar Records)
 1975 Remembering You (Phase One) (This album contains 7 previously released songs (Mr. Success, Julie Do You Love Me, Runaway, Easy Come Easy Go, Early In The Morning, Cried Like A Baby, Our Last Song Together) and 5 new songs not available anywhere else (Beginnings Are Easy, Fresh Out Of Love, I'll Never Stop Singing My Song, Here With You, Just Ask Me I've Been There)).

CDs 

 1990 What Came Before (Teen Ager #622) ("Just For You" with bonus tracks)
 1991 The Very Best of Bobby Sherman (Restless)
 1992 Christmas Album (Restless)
 1995 All-Time Greatest Hits (K-tel) (contains 2 previously unreleased songs, "Where There's A Heartache" and "I Can't Wait Until Tomorrow")
 1995 Bobby Sherman (K-tel)
 1995 Here Comes Bobby (K-tel)
 1995 With Love, Bobby (K-tel)
 1995 Portrait of Bobby (K-tel)
 1995 Getting Together (K-tel)
 1999 My Christmas Wish (KRB) (reissue of Christmas Album)
 2000 The Very Best of Bobby Sherman (Varese)
 2001 Here Comes Bobby / With Love, Bobby (Collectables Records) (2 albums on 1 CD)
 2001 Bobby Sherman / Portrait of Bobby (Collectables Records) (2 albums on 1 CD)
 2008 Just For You (K-tel)
 2010 "Love Songs" (K-Tel)
 2015 "The Partridge Family: Missing Pieces" (Bell) (one track is Bobby Sherman singing "Stephanie")
 2017 "Singles" (Four-Teen) (contains 6 previously unreleased songs, "Stop The Music", "Old Girlfriends", "Over Here", "The New Girl In School", "Beautiful Doll" and "Today I Chipped A Piece Off Of The Sun")

Songs included on various artists compilation CDs 

 1993 Yesterday's Heroes: Teen Idols of the 70's (Rhino)
 1994 Have a Nice Christmas: Christmas in the 70's (Rhino)
 1994 Tube Tunes Volume One: the 70's (Rhino)
 1996 Bubblegum Classics, Vol. 3 (Varese)
 1992 TV Family Christmas (Scotti Brothers)

References

External links

Brigitte & Bobby Sherman Children's Foundation Official website

 Whatever Happened To: Bobby Sherman

1943 births
20th-century American male actors
Living people
Musicians from Santa Monica, California
Male actors from Santa Monica, California
American male singers
American philanthropists
Los Angeles Pierce College people
Singers from California